James Yeaman was (1816 – 11 April 1886) was a Scottish Liberal Party, and briefly Conservative, politician.  He sat in the House of Commons from 1873 to 1880 for as a Member of Parliament (MP) for Dundee.

He was elected at a by-election in August 1873, and re-elected in 1874.  However, at the 1880 general election he stood as a Conservative, and was defeated.

References

External links 
 

1816 births
1886 deaths
Conservative Party (UK) parliamentary candidates
Members of the Parliament of the United Kingdom for Dundee constituencies
Scottish Liberal Party MPs
UK MPs 1868–1874
UK MPs 1874–1880